This list of Broward College alumni includes graduates, non-graduate former students, and current students of Broward College, a state college in Fort Lauderdale, Florida.

List

References 

Lists of people by university or college in Florida